Francesc Burrull (October 18, 1934 – August 28, 2021) was a Spanish jazz musician and composer. In 2017, he was awarded the Creu de Sant Jordi.

Early life and education
Burrull studied at the Superior Conservatory of Music of the Gran Teatro del Liceo in Barcelona. His teacher was Pere Vallribera i Moliné. After completing his career in music and piano, he began to be noticed in the music scene of Barcelona, which had a large and active jazz scene.

Partial discography 

 Fantasía musical thailandesa, EP con la Orquesta Montoliu (1962)
 Negro Spirituals (1971)
 Miguel Hernández (1972) con Joan Manuel Serrat
 Recordando a Duke Ellington (1974)
 Diálogos con Joan Baptista Humet (1975)
 Manuel de Falla avui (con Leonora Milà: piano; Albert Moraleda: bajo y contrabajo; Miguel Ángel Lizandra: batería). Catalonia Concerts Jazz (1976)
 Sinceritat..., con Ricard Roda (1995)
 No son... boleros, con La Voss del Trópico (1996) 
 Blanc i negre (1997), piano solo
 Un poema de amor, con La Voss del Trópico (1999)
 Passeig de Gràcia, grabado con su trío: Llorenç Ametller: bajo; Quim Soler: batería; Francesc Burrull: piano
 Barcelona Jazz, grabado con su trío de jazz.
 Laura Simó & Francesc Burrull interpreten Serrat (2007)
 Temps de pluja (2010), un segundo conjunto de versiones de canciones de Joan Manuel Serrat acompañando a Laura Simó.

References

External links
 
 

1934 births
2021 deaths
Spanish jazz musicians
Spanish conductors (music)
Spanish keyboardists
Jazz vibraphonists
Musicians from Barcelona